Ascender may refer to:

Ascender (climbing), a rope-climbing device
Ascender Corporation, a font company
Ascender (typography), a font feature
XP-55 Ascender, a prototype aircraft
Isuzu Ascender, a sports utility vehicle
JP Aerospace Ascender, a spaceship launch airship
Pterodactyl Ascender, an ultralight aircraft

See also
JP Aerospace Orbital Ascender, an orbital airship design
Ascend (disambiguation)
Ascendancy (disambiguation)